Antonio (Tony) Emil Tuimavave is a Samoan former professional rugby league footballer who played in the 1990s and 2000s, who was the head coach of the Ponsonby Ponies from 2010, primarily as a  also as a . He was nicknamed The Chief because he is a chief back in his native Samoa.

Playing career
Until the formation of the Auckland Warriors, Tony remained largely unheard off outside of the Auckland Scene. He played for the Mt Albert Lions and Northcote Tigers in the Auckland Rugby League competition. He was an Auckland rep from 1988 to 1994 playing over 30 matches for the province. In 1994 he played for the Waitakere City Raiders in the Lion Red Cup, and captained the Western Samoa tour of New Zealand.

He was in the inaugural Warriors side in 1995 and remained a fixture in the squad until his retirement in 2000. He was the last of the inaugural team to leave the club.

Representative career
A Kiwi in 1995, Tuimavave also represented Western Samoa in the 1990 Pacific Cup, 1992 Pacific Cup, and at the 1995 World Cup.

Coaching career
In 2010 he was named the head coach of the Ponsonby Ponies in the Auckland Rugby League competition.

Later years
After his retirement from rugby league he flirted with becoming a professional boxer, winning his only professional fight in 2001. He returned to play for the Mt Albert Lions in the Bartercard Cup in 2004.

He now runs a jet ski rental business in Apia, Western Samoa, and is involved in the grassroots of Samoan rugby league.

Family
Also see :Category:Tuimavave family.

The Tuimavave family has a large presence in Auckland rugby league. He is Uncle to current players Evarn Tuimavave (Newcastle Knights), Carlos Tuimavave (Warriors) and Antonio Winterstein (Cowboys) Chanel Tuimavave played alongside Tony for the Mt Albert Lions in the Bartercard Cup, Paddy Tuimavave played for the New Zealand national rugby league team and Western Samoa and Paki Tuimavave also represented Western Samoa.

References

External links
 Profile at rugbyleague.co.nz
 Boxing profile

1969 births
Living people
Junior Kiwis players
Mount Albert Lions players
New Zealand national rugby league team players
New Zealand rugby league coaches
New Zealand rugby league players
New Zealand Warriors players
Northcote Tigers players
Ponsonby Ponies coaches
Rugby league locks
Rugby league props
Samoa national rugby league team players
Samoan chiefs
Samoan emigrants to New Zealand
Samoan rugby league players
Sheffield Eagles (1984) players
Sportspeople from Apia
Tony
Waitakere rugby league team players
Expatriate sportspeople in England